Fortress of War (translit. Brestskaia krepost; festival title: The Brest Fortress) is a 2010 Russian-Belarusian war film recounting the June 1941 defense of Brest Fortress against invading Wehrmacht forces in the opening stages of Operation Barbarossa, Nazi Germany's invasion of the Soviet Union during World War II. Events are narrated from the perspective of 15-year-old Sasha Akimov, centering on three resistance zones holding out against the protracted German siege. The defending forces are led by regiment commander Major Pyotr Gavrilov (44th Rifle Regiment of the Red Army), with Regimental Commissar Yefim Fomin (84th Rifle Regiment of the Red Army), and the head of the 9th Frontier Outpost, Lieutenant Andrey Mitrofanovich Kizhevatov.

The film makers claim that the plot is as close as possible to historical fact, and that the Brest Fortress Museum supervised the plot thoroughly.

Plot
The film opens on Saturday, June 21, 1941. Sasha Akimov, a 15-year-old musician, and his older brother, Andrey, whose parents were killed in the Spanish Civil War, are serving in the 333rd Rifle Regiment of the Red Army at the Brest Fortress. Elsewhere, a commissar, Yefim Fomin, discovers he is unable to bring his family to Brest due to a shortage of train tickets. Another officer, Gavrilov, continues to express concern about the readiness of the fort's defenses should an attack come, despite warnings from his friend, officer of the NKVD Special Department Lieutenant Vainshtein, about an imminent war with Germany. That evening, the fortress loses power due to sabotage by German commandos.

The next morning, at 3:58, German forces invade the Soviet Union. The fortress is subjected to heavy bombardment by German artillery and Stuka aircraft, killing many Soviet soldiers and civilians. At 6:30, German infantry attack the fortress, capturing hospital staff and patients, many of whom they kill. Fomin takes command of the defenders around the Kholm Gate, while Gavrilov rallies the defenders around the Eastern Fort. Elsewhere, NKVD border guards under command of Lieutenant Kizhevatov, repel a German sortie into the fortress and Vainshtein thwarts a German commando's attempt to undermine the defense of the 132nd Independent NKVD Convoy Battalion barracks. As the siege commences, Sasha finds himself stranded in one of the barracks. During the fighting for the East Fort, Junior Lieutenant Andrey Akimov (brother of Sasha) is killed while destroying two Panzer IIIs with a 45mm anti-tank gun, helping Gavrilov repel a German attack.

By the end of June 22, the Soviet defenders are divided into groups: one force under Fomin defending the Kholm Gate, a second force under Gavrilov defending the Eastern Redoubt, while Kizhevatov defends the 9th Frontier outpost, along with a group of civilians and Vainshtein holds on to the barracks of the 132nd NKVD Battalion. The next day, fighting continues for the fortress and Sasha makes it to the Kholm Gate. An I-16 Soviet fighter aircraft of the 123rd Fighter Aviation Regiment is shot down over the fortress and the pilot is rescued by Fomin's men. He reveals that the Red Army is retreating toward Minsk and Fomin realizes that the men must leave the fortress or die.

On June 24, Sasha leaves the Kholm Gate to alert the other pockets about Fomin's plan for a breakout. While Sasha finds the 132nd has been overrun and Vainshtein dead, he manages to deliver the message to Kizhevatov and Gavrilov. That night, a breakout is attempted by all three remaining groups but is driven back by the Germans, suffering heavy losses. The next morning, realizing he can't properly defend them, Kizhevatov reluctantly orders the surviving civilians (including his own wife and daughter and also Sasha) to vacate the fortress during a cease-fire.

On June 26, the Germans drop a two-ton bomb on the fortress, causing massive damage. The Germans quickly move to eradicate the surviving pockets. The defenders at Kholm Gate are forced to surrender and Fomin is immediately executed by a German firing squad, as a Jew, a communist and a commissar. Gavrilov orders his remaining men to attempt to break out individually. Kizhevatov and his surviving men manage to regroup in the barracks; Sasha returns to meet them there. After ordering Sasha to take the regimental colors and remember the truth about the defenders, Kizhevatov takes a machine gun to cover his men while they attempt a breakout. The breakout fails and the remaining defenders, including Kizhevatov, are killed as Sasha manages to escape.

Years later, an elderly Sasha pays tribute to memorial of Brest Fortress, accompanied by his grandson, to remember the good days and memories of the life before the Nazis took everything.

Cast

 Aleksey Kopashov as Alexander 'Sashka' Akimov
 Andrey Merzlikin as Lieutenant Andrey Kizhevatov
 Pavel Derevyanko as Regimental Commissar Yefim Fomin
 Alexander Korshunov as Major Pyotr Gavrilov
 Mikhail Pavlik as Lieutenant of the NKVD Vanshtein
 Kirill Boltaev as Lieutenant Anatoly Vinogradov
 Sergey Tsepov as Captain Ivan Zubachyov
 Benik Arakelyan as Starshina Samvel Matevosyan
 Yevgeny Tsyganov as Senior Political Officer Ivan Pochernikov
 Yana Esipovich as Katya Kizhevatova, Andrey Kizhevatov's wife
 Veranika Nikanava as Anya Kizhevatova, Andrey Kizhevatov's daughter
 Maksim Kostromykin as Nikolay ′Kolka′, projectionist
 Anna Tsukanova-Kott as Sonya

Production

The film's score was composed by Yuri Krasavin.

References

External links 
 
 
 
 

Films directed by Alexander Kott
2010 films
2010s war films
Belarusian drama films
Russian war drama films
Russian historical drama films
Eastern Front of World War II films
Films set in the Soviet Union
Films set in Belarus
Belarusfilm films
Mosfilm films
Films shot in Belarus
Russian World War II films
Belarusian World War II films
Films set in 1941